Venters Farm Historic District is a historic farm complex and national historic district located near Richlands, Onslow County, North Carolina. The complex includes 23 contributing buildings.  The main house was built about 1896, and is two-story frame, late Victorian farm house with a detached kitchen.  Other contributing buildings include a corn barn (c. 1896), a carriage house (c. 1896), a smokehouse (c. 1896), mule / hay barn (c. 1920s), cow / pig barn (c. 1920s), eight tobacco barns, a brooder house (c. 1946), and seven tenant houses.

It was listed on the National Register of Historic Places in 1987.

References

External links

Historic American Buildings Survey in North Carolina
Farms on the National Register of Historic Places in North Carolina
Historic districts on the National Register of Historic Places in North Carolina
Victorian architecture in North Carolina
Houses completed in 1896
Buildings and structures in Onslow County, North Carolina
National Register of Historic Places in Onslow County, North Carolina